Andy Weir (born 1972) is an American science fiction author.

Andrew Weir or Andy Weir may also refer to:

Andrew Weir, 1st Baron Inverforth (1865–1955), British businessman and minister
Andy Weir (footballer) (born 1937), Scottish footballer